Grzegorz Łomacz (born 1 October 1987) is a Polish professional volleyball player. He is a member of the Poland national team, a participant in the Olympic Games (Rio 2016, Tokyo 2020), and the 2018 World Champion. At the professional club level, he plays for PGE Skra Bełchatów.

Career

Clubs
Łomacz is a silver medallist of the 2013 Summer Universiade held in Kazan. For 3 seasons, he was a player and captain of Trefl Gdańsk. In 2014, he signed a contract with Cuprum Lubin. After a good season and 6th place in PlusLiga, he decided to leave the club from Lubin. On 27 April 2017, it was announced that Łomacz signed a two–year contract with Skra Bełchatów.

National team
On 30 September 2018, Poland achieved its third title of the World Champion. Poland beat Brazil in the final 3-0 and defended the title from 2014.

Honours

Clubs
 CEV Challenge Cup
  2008/2009 – with Jastrzębski Węgiel
 National championships
 2009/2010  Polish Cup, with Jastrzębski Węgiel
 2017/2018  Polish SuperCup, with PGE Skra Bełchatów
 2017/2018  Polish Championship, with PGE Skra Bełchatów
 2018/2019  Polish SuperCup, with PGE Skra Bełchatów

Youth national team
 2005  CEV U19 European Championship

Universiade
 2013  Summer Universiade

State awards
 2018:  Gold Cross of Merit

References

External links

 
 Player profile at PlusLiga.pl 
 Player profile at Volleybox.net
 
 

1987 births
Living people
People from Ostrołęka
Sportspeople from Masovian Voivodeship
Polish men's volleyball players
Olympic volleyball players of Poland
Volleyball players at the 2016 Summer Olympics
Volleyball players at the 2020 Summer Olympics
Universiade medalists in volleyball
Universiade silver medalists for Poland
Medalists at the 2013 Summer Universiade
Projekt Warsaw players
Jastrzębski Węgiel players
Trefl Gdańsk players
Cuprum Lubin players
Skra Bełchatów players
Setters (volleyball)